In mathematics, the Duflo isomorphism is an isomorphism between the center of the universal enveloping algebra of a finite-dimensional Lie algebra and the invariants of its symmetric algebra.

The Poincaré-Birkoff-Witt theorem gives for any Lie algebra  a vector space isomorphism from the polynomial algebra  to the universal enveloping algebra . This map is not an algebra homomorphism.
 
However, Duflo proved that in some cases we can compose  with a map 
 
to get an algebra isomorphism

Later, using the Kontsevich formality theorem, Kontsevich showed that this works for all finite-dimensional Lie algebras.  

Following Calaque and Rossi, the map  can be defined as follows.
 
We can treat map as an element of
 
or, for that matter, an element of the larger space , since .  Call this element
 
 
Working with formal power series, we thus obtain an element
 
 
which is related to the Todd class in algebraic topology.

As a result, the algebra  acts on 
We can thus define a linear map
 
by
 
and since the whole construction was invariant,  restricts to the desired linear map

Properties
For a nilpotent Lie algebra the Duflo isomorphism coincides with the symmetrization map from symmetric algebra to universal enveloping algebra. For a semisimple Lie algebra the Duflo isomorphism is  compatible in a natural way with the Harish-Chandra isomorphism.

References

Lie algebras